Geoffrey Baker (born 28 July 1969) is a member of the Western Australian Legislative Assembly for the electoral district of South Perth for the Australian Labor Party. He won his seat at the 2021 Western Australian state election.

References 

Living people
1969 births 
21st-century Australian politicians
Australian Labor Party members of the Parliament of Western Australia
Members of the Western Australian Legislative Assembly